The Academic Chronicle or Suzdal' Chronicle is a late 15th-century compilation of Rus' chronicles. The chronicle was probably compiled in Rostov based on the Primary Chronicle, Radziwiłł Chronicle (events before 1206), Sofia First Chronicle (events 1205–1238), and Rostov collection (events 1238–1418). The chronicle was published in full in the Complete Collection of Russian Chronicles in 1927. The only surviving original is preserved in the Russian State Library. It is an important source for Russian history of the preceding centuries, and is currently being discussed for its importance for early Russian literature.

Notes

References

East Slavic chronicles
15th-century history books
Russian non-fiction books